Mulao or Mulam can refer to:

 Mulao people, an ethnic group of Guangxi, China
 Mulam language, the Tai–Kadai language spoken by them
 Mulao language (Kra), a dialect of the Gelao language, a Tai–Kadai language of China
 Mulam, an alternative name for hat'h, an obsolete unit of length in India
 Mulao, a village in Liloan, Cebu, the Philippines